The 1917 New Mexico A&M Aggies football team was an American football team that represented New Mexico College of Agriculture and Mechanical Arts (now known as New Mexico State University) during the 1917 college football season.  In their first and only year under head coach John G. Griffith, the Aggies compiled a 4–2 record and outscored all opponents by a total of 231 to 75.

The team's scoring average of 38.5 points per game remains a school record. In the annual rivalry game with New Mexico, the Aggies scored 110 points, which remains the school's single-game scoring record. Robert Foster scored seven touchdowns and 42 points in the game which also remain school records.

Schedule

References

New Mexico AandM
New Mexico State Aggies football seasons
New Mexico AandM Aggies football